Whom Gods Destroy is a 1996 four-issue comic book mini-series, written by Chris Claremont, with artwork by Dusty Abell and Drew Geraci, under the Elseworlds imprint of DC Comics. 

In a world where Superman has not aged a day since the Nazis won WWII, Clark Kent infiltrates Axis dominated Europe in pursuit of Lana Lang, who has fallen prey to the enchantress Circe, while Lois Lane finds herself transformed by the power of the ancient gods into a Wonder Woman.

Plot
In this alternate world, Superman remains youthful due to his superhuman physiology. The Third Reich never fell, and Europe is kept under Nazi rule. Lois Lane has visions of Superman gleefully killing people, including Lana Lang and herself. Meanwhile, the search for Lana—previously abducted—takes Lois and Superman into German soil, where Lana is being held. In flight Lois and Clark get attacked by trolls and harpies, causing the plane to crash land in Germany.

Lois soon discovers that the Reich is ruled by the god Adonis while Artemis and Athena oppose him. Wonder Woman has betrayed Paradise Island and is now part of the Reich. It is also revealed that the Greek pantheon is in league with the Nazis, allowing them to employ mythological monsters to fight superheroes for world domination. A fight ensues between the German army and the Greek heroines. The sacrifice of the goddess Athena endows Lois with powers, transforming her into a new Wonder Woman.

Superman is transformed into an evil centaur by Circe. Lana gifted with the power of the Oracle of Delphi persuades the centaur Superman into realizing his true identity. Superman is transformed into a woman (because his crimes as leader of the Maenads were against women, and therefore, he must take their place). The female Superman then infiltrates the Great Hall of the Reich, which is guarded by the Minotaur. She succeeds in her task due to Lana's magical knowledge. Lois, as the new Wonder Woman, defeats the Nazi Wonder Woman and ties her up with her magic lasso.

Finally, it is revealed that Zeus and Hera were playing a chess game, using the world as their chess pieces. Adonis is sent to be taken care of by Hades. Superman, Lois (now the new Wonder Woman) and Lana all live together on Superman fortress on the moon in polyamorous love.

Publication
 Whom Gods Destroy #1 (52 page, October 1996)
 Whom Gods Destroy #2 (52 page, November 1996)
 Whom Gods Destroy #3 (52 page, December 1996)
 Whom Gods Destroy #4 (52 page, January 1997)

See also
List of Elseworlds publications

References

1996 comics debuts
Comics by Chris Claremont